The Stetson Hatters are composed of 18 teams representing Stetson University in intercollegiate athletics. The Hatters compete in the NCAA Division I Football Championship Subdivision (FCS) and are members of the ASUN Conference for most sports, except for the football team, which competes in the Pioneer Football League. Their mascot is John B.

Sports sponsored 

A member of the ASUN Conference (ASUN), Stetson University sponsors teams in seven men's and ten women's NCAA sanctioned sports.

Golf 
In 1948, Grace Lenczyk won the women's individual intercollegiate golf championship (an event conducted by the Division of Girls' and Women's Sports (DGWS) — which later evolved into the current NCAA women's golf championship).

Notable alumni 
 Jacob deGrom, pitcher for the Texas Rangers
 Logan Gilbert, pitcher for the Seattle Mariners
 Earnie Killum, guard for the Los Angeles Lakers
 Corey Kluber, pitcher for the Tampa Bay Rays
 Donald Parham, tight end for the Los Angeles Chargers
 Donald Payne, linebacker for the Jacksonville Jaguars
 Nick Rickles, catcher, Washington Nationals and Philadelphia Phillies organizations; Team Israel
 George Tsamis, retired pitcher, formerly of the Minnesota Twins

References

External links